Katonaia aida is a species of tephritid or fruit flies in the genus Katonaia of the family Tephritidae.

Distribution
Israel, Egypt.

References

Tephritinae
Insects described in 1938
Diptera of Africa